The Principality of Slutsk was originally a specific Turov Principality of land in the 12th through 14th centuries. It stood out in 1160 and took shape in the 1190s. It became a large feudal principality in the Grand Duchy of Lithuania.

History 

The first mention of Slutsk (Sluchesk) is found in the Tale of Bygone Years circa 1116: Ming Prince Gleb Vseslavich entered into the territory of Vladimir Monomakh and fought Dregoviches Sluchesk Pozega. Although the principality is mentioned in archival documents as early as 1086 and the Bishop of NS Sestrentsovich mentioned it in 1096. News of Slutsk allegedly appears in the Slutskaya hymnals of the 11th century. But the original documents are not available. The most reliable available source is the chronicle Tale of Bygone Years.

Occupied the territory of the Neman and Lani to bird and Pripyat, the city included Slutsk, Kapyl Petric, Timkovichi, Urechye, Luban, Old Road, Umgovichi, Tal, Tundra and others.

The first known owner of Slutsk was Yuri Dolgoruky. In 1149 it passed into the possession of Sluck Seversky Prince Svyatoslav. In 1160-1162 the Slutsky Duchy grandson Vladimir Monomakh (Vladimir Mstislavich) took ownership. Against him was a coalition of princes, led by his brother, the Prince of Kiev Rostislav Mstislavich. Their armies besieged Slutsk and Vladimir Mstislavich was forced to surrender. Two years later the principality was taken by the descendants of Prince George Jaroslavich Turov. In 1387 in a document referred to Prince Yury Slutsky, the last of the dynasty.

At the beginning of the 13th century, Slutsk principality, as well as other fiefdoms on Turov land, became dependent on the Galicia-Volyn principality. In 1320 the Slutsk principality joined the Grand Duchy of Lithuania. In 1395, the Grand Duke of Lithuania Vytautas, passed Slutsk principality to the brother of the Polish King Jagiello Prince Vladimir Olgerdovich, it became part of the Grand Duchy of Lithuania and for two centuries Sluck was one of the political and cultural centers of the state. Until the end of the 14th century, it was ruled by Rurik princes of the Turov line. After Olgerdovich's death in 1440, together with Sluck, Kapyl went to his son and the heirs of Olelko Olelkovich, Semen, Mikhail, Yurii and Simeon.

Olelko Volodymyrovych, in 1440, received the principality of Kiev, and the governor left the principality of Slutsk to Olelko's eldest son, Semen. After the 1454 death of Olelko, Semen received the principality of Kiev and youngest son Mikhail began to reign in Slutsk by 1481. After Semen's death, Mikhail expected the throne of Kiev, but was unsuccessful. He and supporters Prince Fedor Ivanovich Belsky and Ivan Yu. Holshansky decided to overthrow the Grand Duke of Lithuania Casimir IV and to build on the Lithuanian throne Mikhail, as a descendant of Grand Duke Algirdas. But the plot was exposed, and Mikhail was executed in 1481 in the town square of Vilnius. Slutsk principality executed Mstislav Anna (daughter of Prince Ivan Mstsislavsky) and young son Simeon II, who was prince from 1481 to 1503.

Slutsk was the last of independent principalities of the Grand Duchy of Lithuania. It was the only bastion of Orthodoxy in the area.

Princely court
The princely court from 1670 to 1705 hosted a printing house. From 1738 to 1755, a cloth manufacturer was there. In the years 1730–1884, a manufacturer of silk belts and from 1751 to 1760 Radziwill theater shared the space.

In 1791, the principality was liquidated, becoming Slutsk county, Novogrudek province.

With the second partition of Poland in 1793 Slutsk land was ceded to Russia, forming Slutsky District in the Minsk Voblast. Stephanie Radziwill, last in the royal line in Slutsk, moved to live with her husband the Count Ludwig Wittgenstein.

See also
 Slutsk
 Olelkovich

Slutsk
Slutsk
Slutsk
States and territories disestablished in the 17th century
Subdivisions of Kievan Rus'